The Football League play-offs for the 2010–11 season (referred to as the npower Football League Play-Offs for sponsorship reasons) were held in May 2011. The Championship final took place at Wembley Stadium in London, but the League One and Two finals were held at Old Trafford in Manchester, due to a clash with the UEFA Champions League Final.

The play-off semi-finals were played over two legs, contested by the teams who finished in 3rd, 4th, 5th and 6th place in the Football League Championship and League One and the 4th-, 5th-, 6th- and 7th-placed teams in the League Two table. The winners of the semi-finals went through to the finals, with the winner of the final gaining promotion for the following season.

The semi-final matches were played from 12 to 20 May 2011. The finals were held between 28 and 30 May 2011.

Background
The Football League play-offs have been held every year since 1987. They take place for each division following the conclusion of the regular season and are contested by the four clubs finishing below the automatic promotion places.

Championship

Bracket

Semi-finals
First leg

Second leg

Swansea City won 3–1 on aggregate.

Reading won 3–0 on aggregate.

Final

League One

Bracket

Semi-finals
First leg

Second leg

Huddersfield Town 4–4 Bournemouth on aggregate. Huddersfield Town won 4–2 on penalties.

Peterborough United won 4–3 on aggregate.

Final

League Two

*Torquay deducted 1 point for fielding an unregistered player.

Bracket

Semi-finals
First leg

Second legTorquay United won 2–0 on aggregate.Stevenage won 3–0 on aggregate.''

Final

References

External links
Football League website

 
Play-offs
English Football League play-offs
May 2011 sports events in the United Kingdom